Cape Peschany ( Peschanyi Müiısı; , Mys Peschanyy) is a headland in Kazakhstan.

Geography
Stretching out southwestwards this headland is located in the eastern coast of the Caspian Sea south of Aktau. Its name means 'Sandy Cape' in Russian.

References

Landforms of Kazakhstan
Caspian Sea
Headlands of Europe
Headlands of Asia